During the 1920–21 Scottish football season, Celtic competed in the Scottish Football League and the Scottish Cup.

Results

Scottish Football League

Scottish Cup

References

Celtic F.C. seasons
Celtic